The Lehigh Mountain Hawks men's lacrosse team represents Lehigh University in NCAA Division I college lacrosse. The Mountain Hawks play their home games at Frank Banko Field, which is part of a complex that also includes Lehigh's soccer and field hockey venues.

Overview
Lehigh is a charter member of the USILA, one of about two dozen.

Early national titles
According to Lehigh's Epitome Yearbook, lacrosse was introduced at Lehigh in 1884 and four years later, Lehigh entered the Inter-collegiate Lacrosse Association, mostly through the efforts of Arnold K. Reese, an 1889 graduate, who captained and trained the team throughout his college career. Lehigh played its first varsity lacrosse game on May 9, 1885 against Stevens Tech.

According to the Lehigh Burr, Lehigh was a top team in the early years of inter-collegiate lacrosse. Lehigh was third in 1888, second in 1889, and was voted the National Champion in 1890. In what was billed as a "Championship Series" that season, Lehigh defeated Princeton, Johns Hopkins and Stevens Tech to win the title.

Since starting lacrosse, the team has amassed a record of 575–669–10.

Recent history
Lehigh has made three appearances in the NCAA Tournament; their first was in 2012. They earned an automatic bid into the tournament by winning the Patriot League conference tournament over Bucknell, 13–9.

Their first NCAA Tournament game ended in defeat, losing 10–9 against Maryland, after being seeded number seven in the tournament. The Mountain Hawks made the tournament again in 2013, in which they lost to North Carolina.

In 2021, the Hawks advanced to the Patriot League final by defeating Colgate 13–9 in the semi-finals. The conference championship game against Loyola, scheduled for May 9, 2021, was canceled after an outbreak of Covid-19 on the Loyola team. By virtue of the no-contest, Lehigh became the Patriot League's automatic qualifier for the 2021 NCAA Division I Men's Lacrosse Championship. The Hawks were defeated in the first round by Rutgers.

Season Results
The following is a list of Lehigh’s season results during the NCAA Division I era starting in 1971, as well as certain pre-NCAA era seasons:

{| class="wikitable"

|- align="center"

†NCAA canceled 2020 collegiate activities due to the COVID-19 virus.

See also

USILA#List of ILA.2C USILL.2C USILA Champions 1881-1935
Lacrosse in Pennsylvania
Chris Cameron

References

External links